Edwards Cust (born Sedburgh 2 September 1804died Northallerton 5 July 1895) was Archdeacon of Richmond from 1868 until 1894.

Cust was educated at St John's College, Cambridge. He held livings at Danby Wiske, Yafforth and Hutton Bonville.

References

Archdeacons of Richmond
1804 births

1895 deaths
People from Sedbergh
Alumni of St John's College, Cambridge